Cologne/Bonn Airport is a station at Cologne Bonn Airport in the German state of North Rhine-Westphalia. It was built as part of the Cologne–Frankfurt high-speed rail line and opened in June 2004 on an approximately 15 kilometre-long airport loop. It is served by Intercity-Express (ICE), Rhine-Ruhr S-Bahn and regional services.

The Cologne Bonn airport was the third German airport to have a connection to the ICE network after Frankfurt Airport and Düsseldorf Airport.

The approximately 420 m-long and 40 m-wide underground station is classified by Deutsche Bahn as a category 3 station. The four platform tracks are located 18 m below the surface.

In 2002, the projected construction cost of the station stood at €58.3 million. It was funded by the federal government, the state of North Rhine-Westphalia and the Cologne Bonn Airport. In total, the federal government contributed approximately €255 million to the construction costs of the airport loop and station.

Infrastructure

The station has two island platforms, each bordered by two tracks, between concrete walls under an arched glass roof. A large glass-walled staircase in the middle of the platforms is used to change of platform and leads to one of the emergency exits. Escalators and lifts from the platform lead to the basement of terminal 2. The difference in height between rail and platform edge on the outer tracks is 76 cm. The central tracks are laid a little lower, so that their platforms are 96 cm high above the rail. The high S-Bahn sets stop at the low platforms, which cannot be avoided for operational reasons.

The two island platforms are 405 m long and 9.4 m wide.

Crossovers at the north end of the station allow trains to change tracks between the two main platform tracks, allowing ICE services from the north to terminate and reverse, but there are no crossovers at the south end.

The station, which is located in the area between the two airport terminals, is spanned over a length of 156 m with a 36 m-wide steel and glass roof. The 540 tonne roof covers an area of 6,100 square metres.

In June 2007, a two-story connecting building was built at the southern end of the station as a check-in area for Terminal 1 B; this has a steel and glass facade with an area of 1400 m². There was previously only a temporary exit next to the access road. Two escalators and a lift were built as part of the construction.

The platforms have alternating signs: Köln/Bonn Flughafen and Köln/Bonn Airport.

History

The link to the airport was proposed as part the Federal Cabinet's decision on 20 December 1989 to build the new high-speed line on the eastern side of the Rhine.

It also benefitted from the Berlin-Bonn Act of 26 April 1994, which compensated the Bonn region for the relocation of the parliament and parts of the federal government to Berlin. The operator of the airport hoped that the construction of the station, which would strengthen connection between transport modes, would stimulate growth, including of the number of passengers using the airport. Originally, the station, as set out in the design competition, was to be built in a covered tunnel, but instead it was built with a large glass roof. Nevertheless, it is an underground station and is also referred to as such by Deutsche Bahn. So smoking is banned as in other underground stations in Germany.

Planning

The building was designed by the architectural firm Murphy/Jahn, which had already designed terminal 2.

With the opening of the Cologne-Frankfurt high-speed railway, two ICE and three S-Bahn trains could run each hour in each direction through the station. According to the estimates of 1995, about 30 percent of passengers would in future travel to the airport by train.

Construction

The station was constructed in three sections. In the middle section the construction workers encountered during excavation lignite and gravel that could be used directly as a building material, saving construction costs.

After the two ends of the station were created during the reconstruction of the airport in the autumn of 2001, the station building was intended to be an aesthetically-sophisticated centre piece. On 29 January 2002, Norbert Rüther, Ernst Schwanhold, Hartmut Mehdorn and Angelika Mertens performed its groundbreaking ceremony. It was opened on 12 June 2004 in the presence of German Chancellor Gerhard Schröder.

A connecting structure between the station and Terminal 1 was built from May 2006 to June 2007. Deutsche Bahn owns this building, which cost €6 million. It was also designed by the Murphy/Jahn architecture firm.

The construction of the station was the final component of a comprehensive concept for the airport, Terminal 2000, costing more than €500 million. The catchment area of the airport was increased with the new station to more than 20 million people.

Operations

The number of daily ICE trains was reduced from eight to six pairs of trains in 2007 as a result of low demand.

S-Bahn connections

The construction of the airport loop was, for the most part, financed by funds under the Berlin–Bonn Act, especially to improve connections from the Bonn/Rhine-Sieg region to the airport. Currently only Cologne and—Troisdorf in the Rhein-Sieg district—have direct connections to the airport via lines S13 and S19 of the S-Bahn, providing a service every 20 minutes on week days. There is an hourly service to the airport station via Regional-Express line RE 6 (the Rhein-Weser-Express) to Minden and the Regionalbahn RB 27 (the Rhein-Erft-Bahn) along the East Rhine Railway (Cologne–Troisdorf–Bonn-Beuel). Frequent connections are not possible, since the line carries dense freight traffic. A new track (in parts two) are planned to be built along the line from Troisdorf to Bonn-Oberkassel so that services on line S 13 can be extended from Horrem via Cologne Hauptbahnhof, the airport and Troisdorf to Oberkassel. It is planned that another service would run via Bad Honnef to Linz am Rhein. No decision has yet been taken to extend line S 13.

Rail services

The following rail services stop at Cologne/Bonn Airport station:

Notes

External links 
 

Railway stations located underground in Cologne
Rhine-Ruhr S-Bahn stations
Airport railway stations in Germany
S13 (Rhine-Ruhr S-Bahn)
Railway stations in Germany opened in 2004